The 2020 United States presidential election in Florida was held on Tuesday, November 3, 2020, as part of the 2020 United States presidential election, in which all 50 states and the District of Columbia participated. Florida voters chose electors to represent them in the Electoral College via a popular vote, pitting the Republican Party's nominee, incumbent president Donald Trump, and his running mate, Vice President Mike Pence, against Democratic Party nominee, former vice president Joe Biden, and his running mate, United States senator Kamala Harris, of California. Florida has 29 electoral votes in the Electoral College.

Florida was one of six states as well as Washington, D.C., where Trump received a greater percentage of the two-party  vote than he did in 2016.

Miami Beach, Florida, which hosted the 1972 Democratic National Convention, was a finalist to host the 2020 Democratic National Convention. The other finalists were Milwaukee and Houston; Milwaukee was chosen. Florida was Trump's state of residency for this election; New York was his home state in 2016. Trump was the first nominee of either major party to be a Florida resident. Biden was selected as the Democratic nominee in the 2020 Florida Democratic presidential primary on March 17, 2020.

Before the election, aggregate polls had Biden in the lead in Florida by up to almost 3 percentage points. Despite this, Trump won the state by a 3.4-point margin, improving on his margin from 2016, over Hillary Clinton, by 2.2 points; it was the largest margin for any presidential election in Florida since 2004. The main reason was increased support for Trump among Latino voters in the state, particularly in Miami-Dade County, which Biden carried by 7.4 points, significantly less than Clinton's 29.4-point margin in 2016 and Obama's 23.7-point margin in 2012. Trump carried the Cuban vote with 56%, while Biden carried the Puerto Rican vote with 66%, and Trump and Biden split the South American vote with 50% each. Overall, Biden won 54% of Latinos. In this election, Florida voted 7.8 points right of the nation as a whole, the furthest it has voted from the nation since 1988, when the state voted 14.6 points right of the national result. This was the first election since 1992 that Florida backed the losing Republican incumbent as well as the loser of the election overall.

Primary elections 
The primary elections were held on March 17, 2020.

Republican primary
The Florida secretary of state declared Rocky De La Fuente to be a major candidate and thus worthy of automatic inclusion on the ballot.

Democratic primary
Three Democrats were still in the race by the time Florida held its primaries: Vermont senator Bernie Sanders, former vice president Joe Biden, and representative from Hawaii Tulsi Gabbard.

The first Democratic debate took place in Miami over two nights at the end of June 2019. It was broadcast on several of the NBC networks.

General election

Final predictions

Polling
Graphical summary

Aggregate polls

State polls

Donald Trump vs. Michael Bloomberg

Donald Trump vs. Pete Buttigieg

Donald Trump vs. Kamala Harris

Donald Trump vs. Amy Klobuchar

Donald Trump vs. Beto O'Rourke

Donald Trump vs. Bernie Sanders

Donald Trump vs. Elizabeth Warren

with Donald Trump and Oprah Winfrey

with Donald Trump and generic Democrat

with Donald Trump and generic Opponent

with Mike Pence and Joe Biden

with Mike Pence and Kamala Harris

with Mike Pence and Elizabeth Warren

Results

By county

Counties that flipped from Republican to Democratic
 Duval (largest municipality: Jacksonville)
 Pinellas (largest municipality: St. Petersburg)
 Seminole (largest municipality: Sanford)

By congressional district
Trump won 15 of 27 congressional districts, while Biden won 12, including one that elected a Republican.

Analysis
This election was the first time since 1992, and only the second time since 1960, that Florida went to the losing candidate in a presidential election. It was also the first time since 1960 that both Ohio and Florida have voted for the losing candidate in a presidential election, the first time since 1992 that Florida voted Republican while neighboring Georgia voted Democratic, and the first time since 1992 that Florida voted more Republican than North Carolina. Trump also became the first Republican candidate to win Florida with a majority of the state's popular vote since George W. Bush did so in 2004.

Despite his loss statewide, Biden became the first Democrat to win Duval County—consolidated with Jacksonville—since Southerner Jimmy Carter in 1976, and the first Democrat to win Seminole County since Harry Truman in 1948. Biden also flipped Pinellas County back to the Democratic Party. Biden became the first Democrat to win the presidency without carrying St. Lucie County since Bill Clinton in 1992, the first Democrat to win the presidency without carrying Jefferson County since Lyndon B. Johnson in 1964, and the first Democrat to win the presidency without carrying Monroe County since Grover Cleveland in 1884.

Also, this is the first time since 1888 that Florida increased its margin to an incumbent that lost re-election nationally. Florida is one of three states that voted twice for both Barack Obama and Trump, the other two are Ohio and Iowa.

Ex-felons
The United States Court of Appeals for the 11th Circuit, located in Atlanta, ruled that ex-felons could not vote in Florida unless they pay fines and fees. Florida voters approved amendment 4 in November 2018, which restored voting for felons upon completion of all terms of sentence including parole or probation, except for those who committed murders or were involved in sex crimes. The Republican-controlled legislature then passed a law which required ex-felons to settle their financial obligation in courts. United States District Court in Tallahassee ruled against it in May, but the circuit court overturned it in September, which was speculated to have created further problems for ex-felons when they voted in November. Civil rights organizations including American Civil Liberties Union opposed the decision by the court.

Miami-Dade County
In Miami-Dade County, the majority of Trump support came from the west and the majority of Biden support came from the east. People of Mexican, Haitian, and African descent tended to vote for Biden, while people of Cuban, Chilean and Colombian descent did so for Trump, as well as the critical Venezuelan vote swinging Republican. Trump won approximately two thirds of the vote in Hialeah, whereas it was nearly evenly split four years prior. Sabrina Rodriguez of Politico wrote "a vote for Trump has become about more than just him, or even the Republican Party. It's about patriotism." Due to the heavy presence of the Cuban-American community, Hialeah traditionally, as of 2020, leaned towards Republican politics. Trump's coattails played a role in the election of Miami Republicans Carlos A. Giménez and Maria Elvira Salazar to the House of Representatives. 

Residents of Cuban descent often had an antagonism against leftist movements due to associations with Fidel Castro. Trump sought to attract these voters by implementing anti-Cuba policies.

Additionally Trump made efforts to target other Hispanic demographics.

See also
 United States presidential elections in Florida
 2020 United States presidential election
 2020 Democratic Party presidential primaries
 2020 Republican Party presidential primaries
 2020 United States elections

Notes

Partisan clients

References

Further reading
 
 
 
 
 . (describes bellwether Pinellas County, Florida)
 Videos

External links 
 Florida Elections Commission government website
  (state affiliate of the U.S. League of Women Voters)
 
 
 

Florida
2020
Presidential